The AMT Genova, formally known as the Azienda Mobilità e Trasporti and formerly as the Azienda Municipalizzata Trasporti, is a joint stock company that holds the concession for public transport in the Italian city of Genoa.

History 
The first public transport in Genoa was provided by a horse bus service linking the city centre and Sampierdarena, that started in 1873. In 1878, the French company Compagnia Generale Francese dei Tramways (CGFT, French General Company of Tramways) began to build a horse tram system. The city subsequently granted further concessions to two other companies, the Swiss backed Società di Ferrovie Elettriche e Funicolari (FEF, Society of Electric Railways & Funiculars) and the Belgian/Italian Società Tramways Orientali (TO, Oriental Tramway Society). However, by 1894, the FEF had achieved no more than a single short electric tram line between Piazza Manin and Piazza Corvetto, whilst the TO had not progressed beyond the planning stage. The CGFT system had extended through the city and the Val Polcevera, but was still horse operated.

In 1894, the German company Allgemeine Elektrizitäts Gesellschaft (AEG, Common Electricity Company) bought both the FEF and TO companies. The following year AEG created the company Officine Electrical Genovesi (OEG, Genovese Electrical Office), which took over the city's existing electricity supply company, and the Società Unione Italiana Tramways Elettrici (UITE, Italian Electric Tramways Union), which purchased the CGFT's concession. By the end of 1895, AEG has a monopoly of both electricity supply and public transport provision in the city. Under their new ownership, the FEF and the TO developed a tram network of more than  reaching Nervi and Prato, whilst UITE electrified their lines to Voltri and Pontedecimo. Finally in December 1901, AEG merged the FEF and TO into an enlarged UITE.

AEG continued to own and manage the UITE until the outbreak of World War I, in which Germany and Italy fought on different sides. In 1916, new shares were issued and subscribed for entirely by Italian entrepreneurs. In 1927, the city of Genoa acquired a majority share-holding in UITE. In 1965, the city acquired the remaining holding and the UITE's activities were transferred to the Azienda Municipalizzata Trasporti (AMT).

As of the 1st of January 2021, the merger between AMT and ATP Esercizio is going to take place, with AMT absorbing the staff, services and vehicles of ATP Esercizio.

Services 
The AMT manages the following services:

 1 metro line (the Genoa Metro)
 3 funiculars (the Zecca–Righi funicular, the Sant'Anna funicular and the Quezzi funicular)
 1 rack railway (the Principe–Granarolo rack railway)
 1 narrow gauge railway (the Genova–Casella railway)
 10 public lifts, one of which is the Ascensore Castello d'Albertis-Montegalletto
 142 urban bus lines
 1 trolleybus line
 1 water bus line

Bus and Trolleybus Routes

Routes 1-99

1 Caricamento-Cornigliano-Sestri-Pegli-Prà-Voltri
1/ Caricamento-Cornigliano-Sestri-Pegli-Prà-Voltri
3 Stazione Principe-Sestri Via Soliman
3/ Sestri-Cornigliano (Via d'Acri)-Stazione Principe (operated with hybrid buses)
5/ Sestri Via Menotti-Erzilli Polo Tecnologico
6 Stazione FS Cornigliano-Erzilli Polo Tecnologico
7 Via Fanti d'Italia-Via Brin-Via Gallino (Pontedecimo)
7/ Pontedecimo-Rivarolo-Rimessa Sampierdarena-Via Fanti d'Italia
8 Sampierdarena Via Avio-Bolzaneto
8/ Sampierdarena Via Avio-Rivarolo Via Pallavicini
9 Caricamento-Brin-Bolzaneto-Pontedecimo
9/ Pontedecimo-Sampierdarena-Caricamento
13 Prato-Molassana-Brignole-Caricamento
13/ Prato-Gavette-Staglieno-Brignole-Caricamento
14 Prato-Molassana-Brignole
14/ Prato-Gavette-Staglieno
15 Nervi Viale Franchini-Albaro-Via Brigata Liguria
15/ Corso Buenos Aires-Sturla-Nervi
16 Quarto (Autostrada)-Corso Europa-Brignole
17 Via Ceccardi-Stazione Brignole-Corso Europa-Capolungo
17/ Via Ceccardi-Corso Europa-Nervi Via del Commercio
18 Sampierdarena Via Degola-Pronto Soccorso San Martino 
18/ Sampierdarena Via Degola-Ospedale San Martino
20 Foce Via Rimassa-Piazza De Ferrari-Principe-Piazza Vittorio Veneto (trolleybus)
20/ Sampierdarena-Principe-Brignole-Foce (trolleybus)
31 Stazione Brignole-Corso Italia-Sturla-Ospedale Gaslini
32 Largo San Francesco da Paola-Caricamento
32/ Largo San Francesco da Paola-Dinegro
34 Cimitero Staglieno-Piazza Manin-Stazione Principe
34/ Stazione Principe-Piazza Manin-Via Piacenza
35 Ospedale Galliera-De Ferrari-Stazione Principe-Largo San Francesco da Paola
35/ Ospedale Galliera-De Ferrari-Stazione Principe-Via Vesuvio
36 Stazione Marittima-Circonvalmonte-Piazza Manin-Stazione Brignole-Piazza Merani
36/ Stazione Marittima-Circonvalmonte-Piazza Manin-Stazione Brignole
37 Marassi Via dei Platani-Brignole-Via Dante
37/ Piazza Guicciardini-Via dei Platani-Staglieno
38 Stazione Principe-Granarolo
38/ Dinegro-Granarolo
39 Stazione Brignole-Oregina (Via Vesuvio)
40 Stazione Brignole-Oregina (Via Costanzi)
42 Via Isonzo-Via De Gasperi-Piazza De Ferrari
42/ Via Diaz-Via Isonzo
43 Stazione Brignole-Albaro-Ospedale San Martino
44 Piazza de Ferrari-San Martino-Borgoratti
44/ Borgoratti-Corso Torino (full electric)
45 Stazione Brignole-San Martino-Sturla-Ospedale Gaslini
46 Via Donghi-Piazza De Ferrari-Via Donghi
46/ Via Donghi-Piazza Giusti-Piazza de Ferrari
47 Via Pietro (Ascensore)-Brignole-Via Pianetti
47/ Via Pinetti-Fereggiano
48 Molassana-Pronto Soccorso San Martino
48/ Pronto Soccorso San Martino-Cimitero Staglieno
49 Via delle Ginestre-Corso Montegrappa-Stazione Brignole
49/ Stazione Brignole-Largo Giardino
49/ Via delle Ginestre-Via Montaldo-Gavette
51 Sestri Via Biancheri-Via Rollino
51/ Via Rollino-Sestri
52 Sestri Via Biancheri-Via Sant'Alberto-Cimitero Sestri
52/ Sestri Via Merano-Cimitero Sestri
53 Rivarolo Piazza Pallavicini-Borzoli-Sestri via Travi
53/ Borzoli-Sestri
54 Stazione Principe-Via del Lagaccio
57 Chiesa di Santa Maria del Garbo-Piazza Pallavicini
57/ Piazza Pallavicini-Rivarolo Cimitero-Chiesa di Santa Maria del Garbo
59 Via dei Landi-Via Cantore-Via B. Powell-Belvedere
59/ Via dei Landi-Piazza Montano-Belvedere
62 Sampierdarena Via Avio-Coronata-Testa di Cavallo
62/ Sampierdarena Via Avio-Coronata Cimitero
63 Sampierdarena Via Avio-Corso Perrone-Pontedecimo (Via Anfossi-Stazione FS)
63/ Sampierdarena Via Avio-Corso Perrone-via Artigiani-Pontedecimo (Via Anfossi-Stazione FS)
64 Piazza Manin-Righi-Oregina
64/ Piazza Manin-Righi (Funicolare)
65 Cesino-Pontedecimo-San Cipriano
65/ Cesino-Pontedecimo (Gallino)-San Cipriano
66 Via Milano-Cimitero Castagna-Piazza Montano
66/ Piazza Dinegro-Piazza Montano
67 Piazza Martinez-Via Berghini-Camaldoli
67/ Camaldoli-Piazza Giusti
71 Pegli Piazza Rapisarda-Via Carperana-San Carlo di Cese
71/ Pegli FS-San Carlo di Cese
74 Bolzaneto FS-Chiesa di Murta
82 Stazione Brignole-Chiesa di Quezzi
82/ Chiesa di Quezzi-Via Fereggiano
84 Stazione Brignole-Piazza Martinez-Via Amarena
84/ Stazione Brignole-Via Solari
85 Chiesa di Bavari-Borgoratti-Brignole
85/ Corso Buenos Aires-Borgoratti-Bavari
86 San Desiderio-Borgoratti-Brignole
86/ San Desiderio-Borgoratti
87 Apparizione (Cimitero)-Borgoratti-Stazione Brignole
88 / 88/ San Desiderio-Borgoratti-Apparizione
89 Piazza Martinez-Via Giovanni XXIII
93 Pegli FS-Via Vespucci
94 Via Stassano-Via Diano Marina-Prà FS
96 Voltri Via Don Verità-Crevari
97 Voltri Via Don Verità-Fiorino
97/ Voltri Via Don Verità-Località Fabbriche

Routes 100-199 

101 Voltri Via Don Verità-Acquasanta FS
101/ Voltri Via Don Verità-Acquasanta Santuario
128 Erzelli-Piazza Baracca-Piazza di Vittorio
128/ Erzelli-Sestri-Piazza di Vittorio
151 Sestri Via Biancheri-Viale Villa Gavotti
151/ Sestri-Viale Villa Gavotti
158 Piazza Consigliere-Ospedale Micone-Piazza Baracca-Piazza Consigliere
158/ Sestri-Piazza Consigliere
159 Piazza Consigliere-Piazza Baracca-Ospedale Micone-Piazza Consigliere
159/ Sestri-Piazza Consigliere
160/ Via dei Sessanta-Via Rolla
160/ Via dei Sessanta-Cornigliano
165 Piazza Montano-Via Fanti-Piazza Montano
170 Sestri Via Travi-Piazza Virgo Potens
172 Sestri Piazza Baracca-Panigaro
172/ Sestri-Panigaro
188 Prà FS-Via Pavese
189 Pegli FS-Quartiere Giardino
189/ Pegli FS-Via Lorenzini-Quartiere Giardino
190 Pegli FS-Via Lariosa-Via Ungaretti
192 Voltri FS-Via M. Turchino-Via Salvemini-Via 2 Dicembre 
193 Voltri Via Don Verità-Ospedale San Carlo-Via Montanella
199 Voltri FS-Via M. Turchino-Via Calamandrei-Via Don Verità 
199/ Via S. Sulfuree-Via Salvemini-Via Calamandrei-Via Don Verità

Routes 200-299 

270 Brin Metro-Via Linneo-Bolzaneto Via Reta
270/ Bolzaneto-Via Maritano-Rivarolo Piazza Pallavicini Brin Metro
272 Rivarolo Piazza Pallavicini-Via Cambiaso-Begato
272/ Rivarolo Piazza Pallavicini-Via Brocchi
273 Rivarolo Piazza Pallavicini-Via delle Tofane
275 Bolzaneto-Chiesa di Geminiano-Campora
275/ Bolzaneto-Chiesa di Geminiano
276 Bolzaneto-Morego-San Biagio
277 Bolzaneto-Chiesa di Cremeno

Routes 300-399 

340 Piazza Dinegro-Via Asilo Garbarino
355 Via Spallanzani (San Teodoro)-Fregoso
355/ Via Spallanzani-Via Bianco
355/ Granarolo-Fregoso
356 Stazione Brignole-Via Fea (Biscione)
356/ Via Fea-Via Fereggiano
374 Spianata Castelletto-Via Cancelliere
375 Spianata Castelletto-Via Chiodo
377 Spianata Castelletto-Via Ausonia
377/ Spianata Castelletto-Via Montaldo
381 Via Monticelli-Via Biga
383 Via Monticelli-Via Robino
385 Via Torti-Via Imperiale
385/ Piazza Martinez-Via Imperiale

Routes 400-499 

451 Via Bobbio-Via Tortona
451 Cimitero Staglieno-Via Tortona
470 San Martino di Struppa-Bavari-Sant'Eusebio
470/ Molassana-Sant'Eusebio
470/ Molassana-San Martino di Struppa
474 Piazzale Bligny-Via Terpi-Via Lodi-Preli
474/ Preli-Via Lodi
474/ San Sebastiano-Piazzale Bligny
477 Molassana-Via Geirato-Cartagenova
477/ Molassana-Via Geirato-Castello di Pino-Cartagenova
479 Molassana-San Martino di Struppa
480 Stazione Brignole-Via Mogadiscio-Sant'Eusebio
480/ Sant'Eusebio-Piazzale Bligny-Cimitero Staglieno
481 Molassana (Via Geirato)-Pino Superiore (Località Torrazza)
482 Stazione Brignole-Via Valtrebbia-Sant'Eusebio
482/ Sant'Eusebio-Cimitero Staglieno

Routes 500-599

512 Piazza Ragazzi del 99-Via degli Iris
512/ Piazza Ragazzi del 99-Via Anemoni-Via degli Iris
513 Piazza Ragazzi del 99-Colle degli Ometti-Via Nenni
516 Nervi-Sant'Ilario
517 Nervi-Cimitero Nervi-Capolungo
518 Internal Route of Ospedale San Martino (Ingresso-Maragliano)
518/ Internal Route of Ospedale San Martino (Dermatologia Soc.-Ist. Sud)
584 Via V Maggio (Ospedale Gaslini)-Chiesa di Bavari
584/ Via V Maggio (Ospedale Gaslini)-Via Cadighiara

Routes 600-699

603 Stazione Brignole-Via Monticelli-Largo Merlo-Chiesa di Quezzi
603/ Chiesa di Quezzi-Via Fereggiano
604 Stazione Brignole-Via Berghini-Camaldoli
606 Boccadesse-Tommaseo-Manin-Stazione Principe
606/ Boccadesse/Principe-Staglieno-Gavette
607 Nervi-Corso Italia-De Ferrari-Stazione Brignole
607/ Nervi-Corso Italia-Stazione Brignole
607/ Stazione Brignole-Corso Italia (Lido)
617 Capolungo-Corso Europa-Piazza Dante-Stazione Brignole
617/ Capolungo-Stazione Brignole
618 Sampierdarena Via Degola-De Ferrari-Pronto Soccorso San Martino
618/ Sampierdarena Via Degola-De Ferrari-Brignole
634 Cimitero Staglieno-Manin-Largo Zecca-Stazione Principe
635 Via Vannucci-Largo San Francesco da Paola-Dinegro-Caricamento
635/ Caricamento-Dinegro-Largo San Francesco da Paola-De Ferrari
640 Brignole-Piazza della Nunziata-Via Vesuvio-Via Costanzi (Righi)
641 Ospedale Gaslini-Via Orsini-Albaro-De Ferrari-Principe
641/ Ospedale Gaslini-Via Orsini-Albaro-Corso Buenos Aires
649 Via delle Ginestre-Corso Montegrappa-Stazione Brignole
653 Sestri Via Travi-Piazza Consigliere-Via Borzoli-Rivarolo
656 Stazione Brignole-Via Fea
656/ Via Fea-Piazza Giusti
660 Via Milano-Cimitero Castagna-Piazza Montano
663 Sampierdarena Via Avio-Coronata-Corso Perrone-Pontedecimo
663/ Pontedecimo-Corso Perrone-Cornigliano
670 Brin Metro-Via Linneo-Bolzaneto Via Reta
680 Stazione Brignole-Corso de Stefanis-Via Mogadiscio-Sant'Eusebio
680/ Sant'Eusebio-Cimitero Staglieno
683 Stazione Brignole-Via dei Platani-Via Robino-Via Biga-Stazione Brignole
683/ Via Robino-Via Biga-Piazza Martinez
685 Chiesa di Bavari-Borgoratti-De Ferrari-Stazione Brignole
685/ Chiesa di Bavari-Corso Buenos Aires
686 San Desiderio-Borgoratti- de Ferrari-Stazione Brignole
686/ San Desiderio-Corso Buenos Aires
687 Apparizione-Borgoratti-De Ferrari-Stazione Brignole
687 Apparizione-Corso Buenos Aires
697 Via Verità-Crevari-Via Fiorino-Via Montanella
699 Voltri-Via Calamandrei-Via Novella-Via 2 Dicembre-Via Sorgenti Sulfuree-Voltri
699/ Via 2 Dicembre-Via Sorgenti Sulfuree

Night Bus Routes

N1 Pontedecimo-De Ferrari-Prato
N1/ Pontedecimo-Sampierdarena-Brignole-Prato
N2 Voltri-De Ferrari-Nervi
N2/ Voltri-Sampierdarena-Stazione Brignole

Other Urban Routes

Genova-Casella railway bus replacement service
Magenta Crocco lift replacement service
AIR Sestri FS (Passerella Via Cibrario)-Sestri Aeroporto (Arrivi)
ANG Via Col-Via Mura degli Angeli
ANN Salita inferiore Sant'Anna-Via Bertani
BM Servizio Stadio
CS Monumental Cemetery of Staglieno's internal service
DrinBus: this service is a demand responsive mode of transport where people call AMT to book a place on a dedicated bus in the boroughs of Pegli, Bolzaneto, Morengo, Cremeno, San Biagio, Quarto, Quinto and Molassana
FLYBUS Sestri FS (Via Cibrario)-Aeroporto Cristoforo Colombo
F1 Piazza Bandiera-Corso Firenze-Oregina-Righi (funicolare) (replacement bus service for the Zecca-Righi funicular)
GA Sestri Via Bianchieri-Via Rollino-Santuario del Gazzo
G1 Piazzale Pestarino-Granarolo (replacement bus service for the Principe-Granarolo rack railway)
G1/ Principe-Granarolo (replacement bus service for the Principe-Granarolo rack railway
HS Via Cantore-Ospedale Scassi (replacement bus service for the Villa Scassi Lift)
I01 Prà FS-Via Sup. Della Torrazza-Via Villini Negrone
I02 Sestri Via Travi-Via Calda
I03 Via Canepari-Via S. Piombelli
I04 Brin Metrò-Via Mansueto
I05 TAXIBUS Piazza Pallavicini-Via dei Rebucchi
I06 Piazza Masnata-Via del Campasso-Via Spaventa-Piazza Masnata
I07 TAXIBUS: Brin Metrò-Via Buonarroti
I08 Bolzaneto FS (Via Custo)-Via Trasta-Via Adda
I09 Via Linneo-Via Ravel-Via Fermi-Via Linneo
I10 Via Buozzi (Dinegro Metrò)-Via P. Doria-Via Ceppi
I12 TAXIBUS: Piazza Verdi-Via Peschiera-Via Palestro-Via Caffaro
I13 Piazzale Resasco (Cimitero Staglieno)-Via delle Banchelle
I14 Piazzale Resasco (Cimitero Staglieno)-Sant'Antonino)
I15 Doria-Bavari-Sant'Eusebio
I15/ TAXIBUS: Sant'Eusebio-Costa di Sant'Eusebio
I16 TAXIBUS: San Desiderio-Premanico
I17 Via Borgoratti-Via Sapeto-Via Minoretti
I18 TAXIBUS Apparizione-Via Monte Fasce
I18/ TAXIBUS Apparizione-Via Lanfranco
I19 Via Borgoratti-Via Copernico
I21 Via De Vincenzi-Via Spalato-Via Merello-Via De Vincenzi
I21/ Via de Vincenzi-Via Olivo (cimitero)
I22 Largo Merlo-Via Edera-Poligono di Quezzi
I24 Marina Aeroporto-Sestri FS Via Puccini
I25 Piazza Garrassini-Via Monte Rosa
I27 Doria Via Struppa-San Siro di Struppa-Aggio
I28 TAXIBUS: Piazza Pittalunga-Via Nora Massa (chiesa di San Rocco)
I30 TAXIBUS: Piazza Grosso-Cimitero San Desiderio
I31 TAXIBUS: Voltri-Via Fiorino-Sambuco
PR Piazza Pallavicini-Corso Perrone
SALUTEBUS (free bus service) Via V Maggio-Ospedale Gaslini-Casa della Salute
VLB Staz.Brignole-Aeroporto C.Colombo
WDA Staz.Brignole (V.le Duca D'Aosta)-De Ferrari-WTC (Via di Francia)

Interurban Routes

Since the 1st January 2021, AMT started to operate also various interurban Routes, following ATP Esercizio's merging into AMT becoming effective. This interurban branch of AMT is known as AMT Extra

Interurban Routes

A-Z

A:
A AR-CA Arenzano-Cantarena
A AR-CO Genova Voltri-Arenzano-Terralba-Roccolo-Val Lerone-Cogoleto
A AR-TE Terrarossa-Arenzano-Voltri
A CO-BE Cogoleto-Beuca
A CO-CA Cogoleto-Capieso
A CO-LE Cogoleto-Capieso-Lerca
A CO-SC Cogoleto-Schivà-Sciarborasca-Pratozanino
A SC-VO Cogoleto-Sciarborasca-Arenzano-Genova Voltri
Chiamabus Recco (demand responsive service connecting Recco with some outer localities in its municipal boundaries)
C2 Free Circular Bus Route Chiavari (Piazzale Roma-Via Preli-Ospedale)
E:
E BO-SE Genova Bolzaneto-Pedemonte-Valleregia-Serra
E CAMPI Genova Staglieno-Tresasco-Campi
E PE-CA Genova Bolzaneto-Pedemonte-Casella
E PE-SE Pedemonte-San Cipriano-Serra
E PI-CO Picarello-Manesseno-Comago
F:
F BU-MO Busalla-Ponte Savignone-Casella-Avosso-Montoggio
F BU-SA Busalla-Ponte Savignone-Savignone
F GIOVI Genova Pontedecimo-Mignanego-Passo dei Giovi-Busalla-Ronco Scrivia
F MIGNANEGO Genova Pontedecimo-Mignanego-Paveto-Fumeri
F VALBREVENNA Casella-Ponte Savignone-Sorrivi-Nenno-Casella-Valbrevenna-Molino Vecchio
Free CityBus Rapallo
H:
H CRAVASCO Genova Pontedecimo-Campomorone-Isoverde-Cravasco
H GAIAZZA Genova Pontedecimo-Campomorone-Gaiazza-Sareto
RECCO 1 Recco Centro-Mulineti Cimitero (demand responsive service)
RECCO 2 Recco-Polanesi-Monte Fiorito
S:
S BERNARDO Bogliasco-Poggio-San Bernardo
S BO-PI Bogliasco-Pieve Alta-Sori
S SESSAREGO Bogliasco-Sessarego
S SO-AP Sori-Rupanego-Sant'Apollinare
S SO-LE Sori-Sussisa-Levà
S SO-LE Sori-Via Solimano-Teriasca
T:
T Genova-Corso Europa-Recco
T RE-GA Recco-Uscio-Colle Caprile-Lumarzo-Tribogna-Gattorna-Ferrada
T RE-SE Recco-Testana-Serro

1-99

1A Genova Brignole-Prà-A26-Masone-Campo Ligure-Rossiglione-Tiglieto-Vara Superiore
1C Masone-Campo Ligure
1M Masone-Campo Ligure-Rossiglione
2 Chiavari FS-Piazzale Rocca-San Bartolomeo-Sampierdicanne-Chiavari FS
2B Chiavari FS-Piazzale Rocca-San Bartolomeo-Bocco-Camposacco-Villa Oneri
2D Chiavari FS-Piazzale Rocca-Ri Alto (Chiesa)
2S Chiavari FS-Piazzale Rocca-San Bartolomeo
3 Chiavari-Lavagna Ospedale-San Salvatore-Conscenti
4 Chiavari-Sestri Levante-Riva Trigoso
4S Chiavari-Lavagna-Sestri Levante-Riva Trigoso
5 Chiavari-Lavagna-Sestri Levante-Casarza Ligure-Battilana
6 Chiavari FS-Sampierdicanne-San Bartolomeo-Piazzale Rocca-Chiavari FS
6B Chiavari FS-Leivi-Camposacco-Bocco-Ri Alto
7 San Pietro/Santa Maria-Rapallo FS-Santa Margherita Ligure-Campo Sportivo
7F San Pietro/Santa Maria-Rapallo FS-Santa Margherita Ligure
7H Santa Margherita Ligure FS-Rapallo FS-Ospedale
7M Campo Sportivo-Santa Margherita Ligure-Rapallo FS-Santa Maria
7P Campo Sportivo-Santa Margherita Ligure-Rapallo FS-San Pietro
7R San Pietro/Santa Maria-Rapallo FS
7V San Pietro/Santa Maria-Rapallo FS-Santa Margherita Ligure Via Doria
8A Genova Voltri-Arenzano-Cogoleto-Varazze
9 Chiavari-Zoagli (Aurelia)-Rapallo FS
9F Genova-A7-Busalla-Casella-Montoggio
10 Chiavari-Sampierdicanne-Campodonico
10T Chiavari-San Terenziano-Campodonico
11 Chiavari-Borzonasca-Rezzoaglio-Santo Stefano d'Aveto
11B Santo Stefano d'Aveto-Rezzoaglio-Carasco
11S Chiavari-Scoglina-Rezzoaglio-Santo Stefano d'Aveto
12/12B/12N Chiavari-Borzonasca-Belvedere
12C Belvedere-Borzonasca-Carasco
12M Carasco-Mezzanego-Borzonasca
13 Calvari-Carasco-Caperana-Chiavari FS-Rostio
13T Chiavari FS-Rostio-San Terenziano
14/14C Chiavari FS-Villagrande di Cichero-Ferreccio
15 Genova-Bargagli-Gattorna-Cicagna-Calvari-Chiavari
15B Chiavari-Monleone-Ferrada-Gattorna-Bargagli
15C Genova-Bargagli-Gattorna-Chiavari-Carasco
16 Carasco-Isolona-Orero-Cicagna-Ferrada 
17 Ferrada-Gattorna-Neirone-Roccatagliata
18 Ferrada-Cicagna-Lorsica-Favale di Malvaro
19 Ferrada-Gattorna-Ognio-San Marco d'Urri
21 Chiavari FS-Sant'Andrea di Rovereto-San Pietro di Zoagli
22 Genova Prato-La Presa-Terrusso-Cisiano
24 Genova-Traso-Bargagli-Sant'Alberto-Maxena
25 Genova Brignole-Bargagli-Torriglia
25 FONTANIGORDA Torriglia-Montebruno-Fontanigorda-Rovegno
25 M1-2 Genova-Creto-Montoggio-Laccio-Torriglia
25 OTTONE  Genova-Bargagli-Torriglia-Montebruno-Gorreto-Ottone
25 PROPATA Torriglia-Caprile-Propata-Rondanina-Diga Brugeto
26 Genova-Davagna-Scoffera-Torriglia
27 Genova Prato-Calvari-Marsiglia
31 Calvari-Carasco-San Salvatore-Lavagna Ospedale-Chiavari FS-Rostio
34 Chiavari-Graveglia-Conscenti-Statale-Arzeno
35 Genova Bolzaneto-Pedemonte
36 Genova Pontedecimo FS-Campomorone-Isolaverde
36C Genova Pontedecimo FS-Campomorone-Ponte Ferriera
37 Genova Bolzaneto-Piccarello-Sant'Olcese
37C Genova Bolzaneto-Piccarello-Casanova
37P Genova Bolzaneto-Piccarello
38 Genova Pontedecimo FS-Pietralavezzara
38C Campomorone-Pietralavezzara
40 Sestri Levante-Riva Trigoso-Sestri Levante
41 Sestri Levante-Trigoso-Bracco-Ca' Marcone
41CA Spiaggie di Sestri Levante-Parcheggio Powell-San Bartolomeo-Spiaggie di Riva Trigoso-Campeggio del Bracco (Summer Only)
42 Sestri Levante-Moneglia-Bracco-Ca' Marcone
43 Sestri Levante-Deiva Marina-Castagnola-Framura
43C/43D Sestri Levante-Deiva Marina-Castagnola-Costa di Framura
43CA Passano-Campeggi-Deiva Marina (Summer Only)
44 Moneglia-Lemeglio
45 Chiavari-Sestri Levante-Riva Trigoso-Battilana
46 Lavagna-Santa Giulia-Barasso-Cavi
47 Ca' di Lazzino-Castagnola-Levanto
47M Montaretto-Levanto
48 Moneglia-Deiva Marina-Mezzema
49 Castagnola-Bonassola-Levanto
50 Sestri Levante FS-Castiglione-Torza-San Pietro Vara-Varese Ligure
52 Carro-Missano Mereta-Maissana-Varese Ligure
55 Sestri Levante FS-Casarza Ligure-Bargone-Costa di Bargone
61 Sestri Levante-Santa Vittoria-Libiola-Montedomenico
61CA Campeggio Fossa Lupara-Sestri Levante FS-San Bartolomeo-Spiaggie di Riva Trigoso-Campeggio Fossa Lupara (Summer Only)
64 Sestri Levante-San Bernardo-Cascine-Loto-Azaro-Santa Vittoria
70 Rapallo-Ruta-Recco
71 Rapallo-Santa Margherita Ligure-Ruta-Camogli-Recco
73 Santa Margherita Ligure-Ruta-Camogli-Recco
73S Camogli Town Service
75T Genova-Corso Europa-Recco-Rapallo FS
76 Recco-Uscio-Colle Caprile
76T Genova-Corso Europa-Recco-Uscio-Colle Caprile
77 Quartiere degli Ulivi-Santa Margherita Ligure-Nozarego
80 Rapallo-San Martino- Rita
82 Santa Margherita Ligure FS-Paraggi-Portofino
83 Rapallo-San Massimo
84 Rapallo FS-Savagna
85/85 87F Rapallo FS-Arboccò-Chignero
87 Rapallo FS-Sellano-San Quirico-Montepegli
89 Rapallo FS-Via Laggiaro-Via delle Balze
89L Rapallo FS-Via delle Balze-Via Lande-Cimitero
90 Rapallo FS-Zoagli Centro
91 Rapallo FS-Sant'Agostino-Via Lande
92 Rapallo FS-Montallegro
93 Rapallo FS-Costasecca
95 Rapallo-Mexi-Sant'Ambrogio-Rapallo
96 Rapallo-Mexi-Sant'Ambrogio-Zoagli
97 Zoagli-Semorile
98/98C Santa Margherita Ligure-Rapallo-San Pietro-Lavagna-Sestri Levante-Bargonasco

100-199

101 Carasco-Rivarola-Caperana
101C Groppo-Masone-Campo Ligure-Rossiglione
102C Genova Voltri-Mele-Biscaccia
102F Busalla-Crocefieschi-Vobbia-Vallenzona
103F Busalla-Ronco Scrivia-Isola del Cantone-Vobbia
111 Rezzoaglio-Alpepiana-Vicosoprano
112 Rezzoaglio-Priosa-Sbarbari
113 Rezzoaglio-Ertola-Casaleggio
114 Borzonasca-Camponi-Temossi
116 Borzonasca-Caregli
117 Borzonasca-Levaggi-Belpiano-Acero
122 Mezzanego-Borzonasca-Borzone
126/126M Carasco-Borgonovo-Montemoggio-Passo del Blocco
127 Mezzanego-Val Carnella-Vignolo
128 Mezzanego-Porciletto
161 Cicagna-Canevale-Coreglia Ligure
180 Monleone-Lorsica-Verzi-Trino-Cassottana-Cicagna
182 Cicagna-Quartaie-Serra Riccò
183 Gattorna-Quartaie-Cornia
191 Ferrada-Gattorna-Moconesi Alto

300-399

330 Genova Pontedecimo-Campomorone-San Martino Paravanico-Caffarella
331 Genova Bolzaneto FS-Canonero-Livellato
332 Genova Bolzaneto FS-Geo-Santuario della Guardia

400-499

424 Moneglia-San Saturnino-Bracco-Ca' Marcone-Crova-Casale-Moneglia
441 Moneglia-Comeglio-Littorno
442 Moneglia-Casale-Crova
444 Moneglia-Casale-Crova-Ca' Marcone-Bracco-San Saturnino-Moneglia

700-799 

 703 Chiavari FS-Lavagna Osp.-S.Salvatore-Conscenti
 711 Chiavari-Borzonasca-Rezzoaglio-S.Stefano d'Aveto
 712 Chiavari-Borzonasca
 713 Rostio-Chiavari FS-Caperana-Carasco
 715 Chiavari FS-Gattorna-Ferriere-Genova
 725 Genova Brignole-Bargagli-Torriglia-Ottone
 727 Genova-Sampierdarena-A7-Busalla-Bromia
 728 Genova-Creto-Montoggio-Morasco-Bromia
 730 Pontedecimo-Busalla
 731 Chiavari FS-Lavagna Osp.-S.Salvatore-Carasco I Leudi
 735 Bolzaneto-Pedemonte
 737 Bolzaneto-Piccarello-Casanova
 738 Bolzaneto-Piccarello-S.Olcese
 740 Busalla FS-Savignone-Casella-Avosso-Montoggio-Bromia
 750 Sestri Levante FS-Castiglione Ch.-Torza-S.Pietro Vara-Varese Ligure
 772 Recco-Megli-Polanesi-Montefiorito-Recco

800-899

812 Borzonasca-Belvedere
814 Chiavari FS-Villagrande di Cichero-Ferreccio
822 Busalla-Savignone
824 Traso ponte-Traso centro-Traso alto-S.Alberto-Bargagli
825 Busalla-Crocefieschi-Vobbia-Vallenzona
826 Carasco-Montemoggio-Borzonasca
830 Busalla-Borgofornari-Ronco Scrivia-Isola del Cantone
837 Pontedecimo-Paveto
839 Pontedecimo-Fumeri
843 Moneglia-Deiva Marina-Piazza-Passano-Framura Costa-Montaretto- Levanto
847 Moneglia-Deiva FS-Piazza-Cà di Lazino-Framura-Costa-Montaretto-S.Giorgio-Levanto
852 Sestri Levante FS-Velva Santuario-Castello-Carro
856 Varese Ligure-Maissana-Tavarone-Missano*882 Rapallo-Santa Margherita Ligure-Portofino

900-999 

 910 Bromia-Laccio-Torriglia
 915 Borzonasca-Borzone
 916 Borzonasca-Caregli
 917 Borzonasca-Levaggi-Belpiano-Acero
 920 Carasco-S.Colombano-Vignale-S.Martino
 933 Varese Ligure-Cerro- Valletti -Codivara
 949 Cà di Lazino-Castagnola-Bonassola-Levanto
 955 Genova Brignole-Bargagli-Laccio-Trefontane

Fleet

AMT Genova Bus Fleet

Urban Buses and Mid-Buses

1937-1938 Mercedes Benz 315 Sprinter-Sora
1939 FIAT Ducato
3031-3035 Mercedes Benz Sprinter Tomassini CI/26
3301-3330 Autodromo Tango
3842-3851 Irisbus Citelis 10
3852-3871 Mercedes Benz O530 Citaro C2K
3901-3954 Iveco Citiclass 491.10.27
4551-4570 Bredamenarinibus M231 MU
4571-4601 Bredamenarinibus M231 MU
4602-4610 Bredamenarinibus M231 VivaCity MU
4614-4616 Bredamenarinibus M231/E5 VivaCity+ MU
4641-4648 IIA M231/E6 VivaCity+ MU
4801-4824 Bredamenarinibus M230 CU
4951-4973 IIA M231/E6 VivaCity+ MU
4981-4992 Heuliez GX137
5026-5050 Iveco Bus Daily Indicar Mobi City 7
5101-5105 Autodromo Alé (2 Doors)
5201-5225 Autodromo Alé (3 Doors)
5231-5236 Rampini Alé
5241-5244 Rampini Alé Euro 6
5301-5325 Cacciamali TCC685 "Grifone"
5326-5335 Cacciamali TCC690 "Grifone"
5501-5507 Mercedes Sprinter CarInd (owned by Gelosobus and AUTOTICINO)
5601-5608 Iveco Bus Sitcar Road (owned by Della Penna)
7001-7084 IIA Menarini Citymood 10
8701-8750 Scania OmniCity 12
8801-8845 Bredamenarinibus M240 AvanCity LU
8851-8875 Bredamenarinibus M240/E5 AvanCity+ LU
E020-E030 Iveco Urbanway 12 Hybrid
E111-E120 Rampini Alé E80
E301-E314 Irizar ie bus 10
E801-E830 Solaris Urbino IV 12 Electric

Urban Bendy Buses

9141-9146, 9151-9195 Mercedes Benz O530GN Citaro C2
9301-9354 VanHool AG300 New
9401-9417 Solaris Urbino III 18
9421-9422 Solaris Urbino IV 18

Trolleybuses

2101-2117 VanHool AG300 New

AMT Extra

These buses were absorbed into AMT Extra on the 1st January 2021 from ATP Esercizio:

1214-1215 Cacciamali TCC685
1221-1225 Cacciamali Urby
1226-1228 Cacciamali TCC685
1229-1230 and 1233 Cacciamali Urby CNG
1231-1232 Cacciamali Urby
1301-1310 Iveco 200E.9.27 Europolis S
1316-1319 Irisbus 203E.7.23 Europolis S
1330 Isuzu Novociti Life
1401-1403 Bredamenarinibus M240 NS
1404-1405 Heuliez Bus GX117L
1406-1410 MAN NL263 A23 Lion's City M
1411-1412 Iveco Crossway low Entry City
1505-1508 Bredamenarinibus M240 LS
1600 Irisbus Crossway EEV LE 12.8
2108-2111 Irisbus Daily 50C
2112-2113 Otokar Centro
2214-2213 FIAT Dietrich City 21
2307-2315 IIA Menarinibus VivaCity 9
2316-2322 Heuliez Bus GX137
2404-2406 Bredamenarinibus M240 NU
2407-2413 Bredamenarinibus M240 NU AvanCity
2414-2415 Iveco Cityclass Cursor 491.10.29
2416-2417 Otokar Kent C
2506-2511 Iveco Cityclass Cursor 491.10.29
2512-2513 Iveco Urbanway 12 Hybrid
4101-4103 FIAT Ducato
4229-4234 Iveco TurboDaily
4235 Mercedes Sprinter 418
4236-4249 Iveco Daily 50C
4250-4264 Cacciamali TCC775M
4265-4272 Irisbus Daily
4273-4275 Otokar Navigo 185 SE
4277-4278 Otokar Navigo 160 SE
4279-4282 BMC Midilux L750
4283-4290 Irisbus Daily
4291-4292 FIAT Ducato
4293-4294 Irisbus Daily
4295-4297 Iveco Daily Line 50C
4298-4299 Iveco Daily Line 60C
4304-4308 Cacciamali TCI840
4309-4314 Cacciamali Thesi II
4315 Cacciamali TCI840 GT
4420-4429 Iveco 380.10.35 Euroclass Orlandi
4431-4439 Scania De SimonIN 3.301
4440-4445 Irisbus Crossway
4446 Cacciamali TCI972
4448 Cacciamali TCI972
4449-4453 VanHool 913 CL
4454-4477 Iveco Crossway Low Entry Line
4503-4507 Iveco Eurorider Orlandi
4508-4510 Iveco Euroclass 380.12
4511-4515 Iveco MyWay
4516-4253 Scania De Simon IL 3.301

 4525-4530 Bredamenarinibus Lander

4534-4543 Iveco Crossway Line
4601 Irisbus Ares 15.36
5200-5215 Otokar Navigo U
5216 Iveco Daily.
5217 Irisbus Daily
5218-5219 Iveco Daily Line 50C
5220 Iveco Daily Line 40C
8202 Iveco TurboDaily
8204 Irisbus Daily
8206 Irisbus Daily
8207 Iveco Daily Tourys
8402 Irisbus Crossway
8505-8506 Irisbus Domino 2001 Orlandi

 8507-8508 Irisbus Evadys

Former Fleet of AMT Genova

The fleet series numbers mentioned in this section include vehicles which are no longer in service at AMT, and have either been withdrawn or demolished. A few vehicles, however, have been preserved by AMT and private organisations.

Private Hire, Suburban, and Interurban Buses

130 Iveco 315.8.17 Menarini
201-210 FIAT 308R Cameri
306-321 Iveco 370.10.25
381-384 and 386-388 Iveco 380.10.35 EuroClass Orlandi
830-831 Bredamenarinibus M220E/LS
910 and 920 Iveco 370.10.24
930 Iveco 370S.10.24
970 Menarini M102/1 SBH
980, 982, and 984 Iveco 380.12 Orlandi TopClass

Urban Minibuses

1001-1002 Iveco CAM Pollicino 280 TH 
1003 Iveco CAM Pollicino NEW TH
1010-1011 Autodromo Pollicino New
1935-1936 FIAT Ducato Sora
3011-3016 Iveco CAM Pollicino 280 AU
3020-3025 Autodromo Pollicino New 
3041-3045 FIAT 242 Coriasco
M001-M007 Mercedes Benz O413 Sprinter Sora (M005 and M007 sold to the Protezione Civile
M020-M021 Mercedes Benz O416 Sprinter CNG Sora

Urban Buses and Midbuses

3101-3180 FIAT 418 AC Cameri (Vöv windscreen)
3181-3192 FIAT 418 AC Cameri
3201-3230 FIAT 418 AC Portesi AU310
3251-3290 FIAT 418 AC BCF AU610A
3401-3440 FIAT 418 AC Portesi AU295
3441-3469 FIAT 418 AC Portesi 2021
3501-3530 FIAT 418 AL De Simon
3601-3650 FIAT 418 AL Cameri
3701-3705 Iveco 480.9.3 TurboCity Viberti U992
3721-3725 Iveco 490.12.22 TurboCity-UR
3801-3841 Iveco 490.12.22 TurboCity-UR
4001-4006 Iveco 470.10.20
4011-4043 Iveco 471.10.20 U-Effeuno (no. 4027, 4028, and 4039 have been sold to AMT Vittuone)
4051-4055 Iveco 471.10.20 U-Effeuno Viberti U692
4101-4141 Inbus Bredabus U210 FT-N
4201-4243 Menarini M201/2 NU
4301-4370 Bredabus BB 2001.10 LL
4561 and 4562 Bredamenarinibus M231 MU
4580 Bredamenarinibus M231 MU
4601-4667 FIAT 409 Menarini M1231
4671 Siccar 181C
4672-4698 Inbus U150 Siccar 181CU
4701-4725 FIAT 314/3 Portesi AU277
4736-4796 Iveco 316.8 Portesi VS
4851-4864 Menarini M1201/3
4871-4885 FIAT 316.8.13 Menarini C13
4891-4895 FIAT 316.8.17 Menarini C13
4901-4917 Iveco 418 AC Portesi VS.880 
4921-4946 Inbus Bredabus U150 Siccar 181MU (4935 and 4946 sold to AMT Vittuone)
5001-5025 Cacciamali TCC685 L1M "Grifone"
5327 Cacciamali TCC690 "Grifone"
8001-8100 FIAT 421 AL Cameri
8101-8112 Iveco 471.12.20 U-Effeuno
8121-8130 Iveco 471.12.21 TurboCity-U
8201-8265 Iveco 470.12.20
8301-8310 Inbus U210 Siccar 176UL
8401-8410 Menarini M201LU
8501-8505 Iveco 470.12.20 Mauri
8601-8641 Iveco Cityclass 491.12.27
8651-8670 Iveco Cityclass Cursor 491.12.29
8671-8693 Iveco CityClass Cursor 491.12.29
8702,8717, and 8731 Scania OmniCity 12
8802 and 8836 Bredamenarinibus M240 AvanCity LU
E001-E016 Iveco 490.12.22 TurboCity-UR "Altrobus"
E017-E018 Iveco 490.12.22 TurboCity-UR Viberti "Altrobus"
E101-E108 Cacciamali Elfo
E201-E205 Mercedes Benz O520 Cito 9,6 m

Bendy Buses

9001-9040 Iveco 471.18.24 U-Effeuno Viberti
9051-9119 Bredamenarinibus M321 U 
9121-9135 MAN 253 A23
9201-9223 Iveco 491.18.35 CityClass Cursor
9307 VanHool AG300 New

Preserved Buses

The following vehicles, identified by their fleet number, have been preserved by AMT and private enthusiasts heritage bus associations:

3012 Iveco CAM Pollicino 280 AU (purchased by the Parish Church of San Giovanni della Rimessa in 2017). 
3123 FIAT 418 AC Cameri (preserved by AMT)
3127 FIAT 418 AC Cameri (preserved by the Associazione "Il Capolinea" in Genoa)
3328 Autodromo Tango UM (preserved by STORICBUS La Spezia in 2021).
4239 Menarini M201/2 NU (preserved by STORICBUS La Spezia in 2011)
4317, 4353, and 4364 Bredabus BB 2001.10 LL (preserved by STORICBUS La Spezia in 2018 and 2019)
4320 Bredabus BB 2001.10 LL (preserved by Associazione FITRAM La Spezia in 2018)
4346 Bredabus BB 2001.10 LL (preserved by AMAS Catania)
4536 Bredamenarinibus M230 MU (preserved by STORICBUS La Spezia in 2021).
4616 FIAT 409 Menarini M1231 (preserved by the Associazione "Il Capolinea" in Genoa)
4912 Iveco 418 AC Portesi VS.880 (preserved by Associazione FITRAM La Spezia)
8070 FIAT 421 AL Cameri
8657 Iveco 491.12.27 CityClass (Preserved by STORICBUS La Spezia in 2023). 
8691 Iveco 491.12.27 CityClass Cursor (preserved by STORICBUS La Spezia in 2020)
9064 Bredamenarinibus M321 U (preserved by Associazione FITRAM La Spezia in 2020)
9072 Bredamenarinibus M321 U (preserved by STORICBUS La Spezia in 2019)

Trolleybuses

2001-2020 Bredamenarinibus M220 FLU Bredabus

Rolling Stock

Genoa Metro

01-016 Ansaldo trainsets
11-22 Firema 67 A trainsets
31-37 Hitachi rail trainsets

Genova-Casella railway

A1-A2 T.I.B.B. Carminati&Toselli trainsets (formerly of the Val di Fiemme Electric Railway)
A5-A6 T.I.B.B. Carminati&Toselli trainsets (formerly of the Spoleto-Norcia railway line)
A8-A10 Firema/OMS trainsets
A11-A12 Firema/OMS trainsets
29 T.I.B.B. electric locomotive (formerly of the Ferrovia Adriatico Sangritana)
D1 Gmeinder / MAK diesel locomotive (formerly of Deutsche Bundesbahn)
C21 Breda rail coach
C50-C53 Breda rail coaches
F23 Freight wagon

See also 
 Trolleybuses in Genoa
 Genoa Metro
 ATP Esercizio

References

External links 
 
 Official AMT web site (in Italian)

Companies based in Genoa
RATP Group
Transport companies of Italy
Transport in Genoa